The Filmfare Best Sound is given by the Filmfare magazine as part of its annual Filmfare Awards for Hindi films.

Here is a list of some of the award winners and the films for which they won.

List

See also 
 Filmfare Awards
 Bollywood
 Cinema of India

References

External links
 Filmfare Awards winners by the year 

Sound